Jobu Mekaniske Verksted AS (Jobu Mechanical Manufacturers) in Drøbak, Norway, was founded in 1947 by timber merchant Trygve Johnsen and gunsmith Gunnar Busk in 1947. The company produced chainsaws and other forestry machines in the period 1948 to 1979. The brand continued until 1983.

Johnson and Busk were themselves responsible for the construction of the first commercial chainsaw, "Jobu Senior," which had an "Aspin" engine with a standard carburetor with float chamber. Whenever the saw was placed on the side, the carburetor had to be rotated accordingly. Jobu Senior weighed 17.5 kg and was only applicable for felling and bucking.
The next model was Junior, which was released on the market in 1952. The engine in Junior was manufactured by Jobu themselves. Junior came with its predecessor carburetor solution that still had to be rotated. The weight was reduced to 10.4 kg. This saw became very popular, and around 40 000 units were produced. Jobu Tiger, which came in 1960, was a major advance. This model had a diaphragm carburetor that worked in all positions.

Jobu was for a long time the market leader in Norway. In the latter half of the 1960s and in the 1970s Jobu saws were also exported to various countries in Europe and even the United States.
Jobu produced several different options for their chainsaws. Best known is a propeller that converted the chainsaw to an outboard motor. This was available for both Senior and Junior Jobu. They also produced an auger for Junior Tiger .
The company was later purchased by Christiania Spigerverk in Oslo, which later merged with Elkem to become Elkem Spigerverket. In 1983 it was sold to Electrolux in Sweden, and the production of Jobu-saws was terminated.

References

Manufacturing companies established in 1947
Defunct companies of Norway
Chainsaws
Norwegian brands
Electrolux brands
Norwegian companies established in 1947
1983 disestablishments in Norway
Manufacturing companies disestablished in 1983